The Destiny of Marty Fine is a 1996 American drama film directed by Michael Hacker and starring Norman Fell, Michael Ironside, Alan Gelfant, Catherine Keener and James LeGros.  Mark Ruffalo co-wrote the film with Hacker.

Cast
Alan Gelfant as Marty Fine
James LeGros as Grill
Catherine Keener as Lena
Michael Ironside as Capelli
Glenn Plummer as Mike
John Diehl as Deke
Sandra Seacat as Gypsy
Norman Fell as Daryl
Katherine LaNasa as Amy

Release
The film was released on March 16, 1996 at South by Southwest.

Reception
Joe Leydon of Variety gave the film a negative review, calling it "a genuine eyesore."

Nathan Rabin of The A.V. Club also gave the film a negative review and wrote, "Unfortunately, it's also not a very good movie."

References

External links
 
 

1990s English-language films